Christian Lenze (born 26 April 1977 in Magdeburg, Germany) is a German former professional footballer who played as midfielder.

References

1977 births
Living people
Sportspeople from Magdeburg
German footballers
Association football midfielders
SV Werder Bremen II players
Eintracht Frankfurt players
Eintracht Braunschweig players
1. FC Magdeburg players
FC Erzgebirge Aue players
VfL Osnabrück players
VfB Oldenburg players
Kickers Emden players
2. Bundesliga players
3. Liga players